Windy Pass may be one of the following mountain passes:

Canada
Windy Pass (Canada), between Alberta and British Columbia

United States
Windy Pass (Arizona), Maricopa County, Arizona
Windy Pass (Archuleta County, Colorado), Archuleta County, Colorado
Windy Pass (Mineral County, Colorado), Mineral County, Colorado
Windy Pass (Idaho), Bannock County, Idaho
Windy Pass (Gallatin County, Montana), Gallatin County, Montana
Windy Pass (Gallatin and Madison counties, Montana), between Gallatin County, Montana and Madison County, Montana
Windy Pass (Lincoln County, Montana), Lincoln County, Montana
Windy Pass (Powell County, Montana), Powell County, Montana
Windy Pass (Nevada), Nye County, Nevada
Windy Pass (Harney County, Oregon), Harney County, Oregon
Windy Pass (Lane County, Oregon), Lane County, Oregon
Windy Pass (Utah), Utah County, Utah
Windy Pass (Alpine Lakes), Alpine Lakes Wilderness, Washington
Windy Pass (Chelan County, Washington), Chelan County, Washington
Windy Pass (Kittitas County, Washington), Kittitas County, Washington
Windy Pass (Skamania County, Washington), Skamania County, Washington

See also
 Windy Gap (disambiguation)
 Windy Saddle (disambiguation)